Khoroshyovskaya is a station on the Bolshaya Koltsevaya line of the Moscow Metro. It opened on 26 February 2018 as one of five initial stations on the new line.

The station's name comes from the area of Khoroshyovo, which was supposedly named by Ivan the Terrible.

Infrastructure
The latter branch may ultimately become part of the planned Rublyovo-Arkhangelskaya line.

References

Moscow Metro stations
Railway stations in Russia opened in 2018
Bolshaya Koltsevaya line
Railway stations located underground in Russia